The 8th New York State Legislature, consisting of the New York State Senate and the New York State Assembly, met from October 12, 1784, to April 27, 1785, during the eighth year of George Clinton's governorship, at New York City.

Background
Under the provisions of the New York Constitution of 1777, the State Senators were elected on general tickets in the senatorial districts, and were then divided into four classes. Six senators each drew lots for a term of 1, 2, 3 or 4 years and, beginning at the election in April 1778, every year six Senate seats came up for election to a four-year term. Assemblymen were elected countywide on general tickets to a one-year term, the whole assembly being renewed annually.

Elections
The State election was held from April 27 to 29, 1784. Senators William Floyd, Ezra L'Hommedieu, Alexander McDougall (all Southern D.), and Arthur Parks (Middle D.) were re-elected; and Assemblyman Peter Van Ness (Western D.) was elected to the Senate.

Sessions
 
The State Legislature first met at the Old City Hall in New York City, the Assembly on October 12, the Senate on October 18, 1784; and both Houses adjourned on November 29. In January 1785, the Congress of the Confederation met at the Old City Hall, New York City thus becoming the federal capital of the United States. When the Legislature met again, it moved to the Exchange on the corner of Broad and Water streets in New York City; the Senate met on January 24, the Assembly on January 27, 1785; and both Houses adjourned on April 27.

State Senate

Districts
The Southern District (9 seats) consisted of Kings, New York, Queens, Richmond, Suffolk and Westchester counties.
The Middle District (6 seats) consisted of Dutchess, Orange and Ulster counties.
The Eastern District (3 seats) consisted of Washington, Cumberland and Gloucester counties.
The Western District (6 seats) consisted of Albany and Montgomery counties.

Note: There are now 62 counties in the State of New York. The counties which are not mentioned in this list had not yet been established, or sufficiently organized, the area being included in one or more of the abovementioned counties.

Senators
The asterisk (*) denotes members of the previous Legislature who continued in office as members of this Legislature. Ebenezer Russell and Peter Van Ness changed from the Assembly to the Senate.

Employees
Clerk: Abraham B. Bancker

State Assembly

Districts
The City and County of Albany (10 seats)
Cumberland County (3 seats)
Dutchess County (7 seats)
Gloucester County (2 seats)
Kings County (2 seats)
Montgomery County) (6 seats)
The City and County of New York (9 seats)
Orange County (4 seats)
Queens County (4 seats)
Richmond County (2 seats)
Suffolk County (5 seats)
Ulster County (6 seats)
Washington County (4 seats)
Westchester County (6 seats)

Note: There are now 62 counties in the State of New York. The counties which are not mentioned in this list had not yet been established, or sufficiently organized, the area being included in one or more of the abovementioned counties.

Assemblymen
The asterisk (*) denotes members of the previous Legislature who continued as members of this Legislature.

Employees
Clerk: John McKesson

Notes

Some confusion still exists as to Speaker; New York Packet of 10/25/1784 printed a letter to Clinton from the Assembly in response to his address, and Hathorn is shown as the author and title is Speaker.

Sources
The New York Civil List compiled by Franklin Benjamin Hough (Weed, Parsons and Co., 1858) [see pg. 108 for Senate districts; pg. 112f for senators; pg. 148f for Assembly districts; pg. 162 for assemblymen]

1784 in New York (state)
1785 in New York (state)
008